J68 may refer to:
 Augmented truncated dodecahedron
 , a minesweeper of the Royal Navy
 LNER Class J68, a British steam locomotive class